Pobrežje may refer to:

 Pobrežje District, a suburb of Maribor, Slovenia
 Pobrežje, Črnomelj, a village near Črnomelj, Slovenia
 Pobrežje, Videm, a village near Ptuj, Slovenia
 Pobrežje, Podgorica, a suburb of Podgorica, Montenegro
 Pobrežje, Croatia, a village near Dubrovnik, Croatia